Thomaz Koch (born 11 May 1945) is a former tennis player from Brazil, who was a quarterfinalist at the French Open, Wimbledon and the U.S. National Championships.

He won at least 14 singles titles (three in the Open Era) and three doubles titles. While Koch's career-high ATP singles ranking was No. 24 (achieved on December 20, 1974), he ranked inside the top 20 in the 1960s before the invention of the ATP rankings, peaking at No. 12.

He won two gold medals in the men's tennis competition at the 1967 Pan American Games. He also won the Wimbledon Plate twice, in 1969 and 1975.

Open Era career finals

Singles (3–2)

Doubles (3–8)

Mixed doubles (1–0)

References

External links
 
 
 

1945 births
Living people
Brazilian male tennis players
Brazilian people of German descent
French Open champions
Sportspeople from Porto Alegre
Tennis players at the 1963 Pan American Games
Tennis players at the 1967 Pan American Games
Grand Slam (tennis) champions in mixed doubles
Pan American Games gold medalists for Brazil
Pan American Games medalists in tennis
Medalists at the 1967 Pan American Games
20th-century Brazilian people
21st-century Brazilian people